Szafarnia  is a village in the administrative district of Gmina Lelis, within Ostrołęka County, Masovian Voivodeship, in east-central Poland. In 1975–98 Szafarnia was part of Ostrołęka Voivodeship.

Szafarnia is one of three villages of that name in Poland (the other two being in Kuyavian-Pomeranian Voivodeship and Warmian-Masurian Voivodeship).

References

Szafarnia